is a railway station located in Nōgata, Fukuoka.

Lines 

Chikuhō Electric Railroad
Chikuhō Electric Railroad Line

Platforms

Adjacent stations

Surrounding area
 Family Mart
 Japan National Route 200
 Fukuoka Prefectural Route 73
 Ganda Elementary School
 Nōgatadaini Junior High School
 Nogata St. Paul Kindergarten
 Nōgata Central Hospital
 Ichou Naikageka Clinic
 Onomuta Lake

Railway stations in Fukuoka Prefecture
Railway stations in Japan opened in 1959